Chandernagore Government College, (French: Collège gouvernemental de Chandernagor) is a government college in Chandannagar, West Bengal, India. It is one of the oldest colleges in Hooghly district. It offers undergraduate courses in arts, commerce, and sciences. It is affiliated to University of Burdwan.

History 
It is the oldest college of the district having glorious past. Initially it was St. Mary's Institution founded in 1862 by the French Catholic Missionary, Rev. Magloire Barthet. The institution was renamed as Dupleix College in 1901, in memory of Governor General Joseph François Dupleix. At the time of Indian independence movement, this college became a centre of revolutionary activities. Professor Charuchandra Ray was the mentor of Bengali revolutionaries. The college received official recognition by the French government and was brought under the French Education Directorate only in June 1938. In 1947 the college was again renamed as Chandernagore College.

Departments

Science

Chemistry
Physics
Mathematics
Botany
Zoology
Computer Science
Environmental Science

Arts and Commerce
Accountancy
Bengali
English
Sanskrit
History
Geography
Political Science
Philosophy
Education
Economics
Sociology
French

Accreditation
The college is recognized by the University Grants Commission (UGC).

Notable faculty
Bibhuti Bhusan Nandy, spymaster and columnist
Basabi Pal, professor of French

See also

References

External links
Chandernagore Government College Admission 

Colleges affiliated to University of Burdwan
Universities and colleges in Hooghly district
Chandannagar
Government colleges in West Bengal
1862 establishments in India
Educational institutions established in 1862